Kenai Peninsula Borough is a borough of the U.S. state of Alaska. As of the 2020 census, the population was 58,799, up from 55,400 in 2010. The borough seat is Soldotna, the largest city is Kenai, and the most populated community is the census-designated place of Kalifornsky.

The borough includes most of the Kenai Peninsula and a large area of the mainland of Alaska on the opposite side of Cook Inlet.

Geography

Adjacent boroughs and census areas
 Bethel Census Area, Alaska - northwest
 Matanuska-Susitna Borough, Alaska - north
 Municipality of Anchorage, Alaska - north
 Chugach Census Area, Alaska - east
 Lake and Peninsula Borough, Alaska - west
 Kodiak Island Borough, Alaska - south

National protected areas
 Alaska Maritime National Wildlife Refuge (part of Gulf of Alaska unit)
 Chiswell Islands
 Tuxedni Wilderness
 Chugach National Forest (part)
 Katmai National Park and Preserve (part)
 Katmai Wilderness (part)
 Kenai Fjords National Park
 Kenai National Wildlife Refuge
 Kenai Wilderness
 Lake Clark National Park and Preserve (part)
 Lake Clark Wilderness (part)

Ecology
Bear Lake, Tutka Bay, and the Trail Lakes, have been the site of salmon enhancement activities. All three sites are managed by the Cook Inlet Aquaculture Association Some of the fish hatched at these facilities are released into the famous Homer fishing hole. Cook Inlet Keeper and the Cook Inlet Regional Citizen's Advisory Council are groups that attempt to influence public policy on the use of the areas resources.

Demographics

As of the census of 2000, there were 49,700 people, 18,400 households, and 12,700 families residing in the borough.  The population density was 1/km2 (3/sq mi).  There were 24,900 housing units at an average density of 2 per square mile (1/km2).  The racial makeup of the borough was 86% white, 7% Native American, 2% Hispanic or Latino (any race), and 4% from two or more races.  Black or African Americans, Asians, and Pacific Islanders each were less than 1%. Just under 1% were from other races combined. 1.92% reported speaking Russian at home, while 1.74% spoke Spanish.

Of the 18,400 households, 38% had children under the age of 18 living with them, 55% were married couples living together, 9% had a female householder with no husband present, and 31% were non-families. 25% of households were one person, and 5% were one person aged 65 or older.  The average household size was 2.6 and the average family size was 3.2.

In the borough the population was spread out, with 30% under the age of 18, 7% from 18 to 24, 30% from 25 to 44, 26% from 45 to 64, and 7% 65 or older.  The median age was 36 years. For every 100 females, there were 109 males; for every 100 females age 18 and over there were 110 males.

Government and infrastructure
There is a borough-wide government based in Soldotna, consisting of a strong mayor and an assembly of representatives from all areas of the borough. They collect sales and property taxes and provide services such as road maintenance, waste collection facilities, emergency services and major funding for public schools, along with mitigation of damage from spruce bark beetles that infested the borough in the late 1990s and early 2000s. Incorporated towns also have their own local governments and city councils.
The Alaska Department of Corrections operates the Spring Creek Correctional Center near Seward  and the Wildwood Correctional Complex near Kenai.

Communities

Cities
 Homer
 Kachemak
 Kenai
 Seldovia
 Seward
 Soldotna

Census-designated places

 Anchor Point
 Bear Creek
 Beluga
 Clam Gulch
 Cohoe
 Cooper Landing
 Crown Point
 Diamond Ridge
 Fox River
 Fritz Creek
 Funny River
 Halibut Cove
 Happy Valley
 Hope
 Kalifornsky
 Kasilof
 Lowell Point
 Moose Pass
 Nanwalek
 Nikiski
 Nikolaevsk
 Ninilchik
 Point Possession
 Port Graham
 Primrose
 Ridgeway
 Salamatof
 Seldovia Village
 Sterling
 Sunrise
 Tyonek

Unincorporated communities
 Jakolof Bay
 Kachemak Selo
 Razdolna
 Voznesenka

Ghost town
 Portlock

Education
The school district for the whole borough is Kenai Peninsula Borough School District.

See also

 2006 Arctic Winter Games
 Kalgin Island
 List of airports in the Kenai Peninsula Borough
 State parks on the Kenai Peninsula

References

External links

 
 Borough map, 2000 census: Alaska Department of Labor
 Borough map, 2010 census: Alaska Department of Labor

 
1964 establishments in Alaska
Populated places established in 1964